José Manuel Pinillo (8 March 1902 – 8 September 1968) was a Spanish freestyle swimmer. He competed in two events at the 1924 Summer Olympics.

References

External links
 

1902 births
1968 deaths
Spanish male freestyle swimmers
Olympic swimmers of Spain
Swimmers at the 1924 Summer Olympics
Sportspeople from Seville